Christopher Anthony Willock (born 31 January 1998) is an English professional footballer who plays as a forward for Championship club Queens Park Rangers.

Club career

Arsenal
Born in the London Borough of Waltham Forest, Willock joined Arsenal's academy when he was five years old. He, then aged 16, appeared for the Arsenal first team in a pre-season friendly in 2014 when Arsène Wenger described him as a "very interesting player". At the end of the 2015–16 season, he scored and provided two assists in a victory over Aston Villa in the U21 Premier League play-off final held at the Emirates Stadium. He made his first team debut on 20 September 2016 against Nottingham Forest in the League Cup.

Benfica
On 30 June 2017, Willock signed a five-year contract with Portuguese champions Benfica. He made his Benfica debut with the reserve team in a LigaPro match against Varzim on 23 August 2017.

West Bromwich Albion (loan)
On 8 August 2019, Willock joined West Bromwich Albion on a season-long loan with options to review the agreement in January; however, he did not make a single appearance for West Brom in the four months he was there.

Huddersfield Town (loan)
After struggling to break into the first team at West Brom, Willock joined Huddersfield Town on 31 January 2020. He went on to score 2 goals for the club with one of those being against West Brom, the team he had just been loaned at.

Queens Park Rangers
On 5 October 2020, Willock joined Championship side Queens Park Rangers for £750,000 on a three-year deal with an option for a further year. He scored his first goal for QPR in a 1–0 win over Cardiff City on 20 January 2021. On 10 December 2021, Willock was awarded the EFL Championship Player of the Month award for November 2021 after scoring three and assisting the other three of his side's six goals in the month. Willock's manager Mark Warburton was awarded the league's Manager of the Month award also. Willock ended the 2021–22 season with the Supporters' Player of the Year, Ray Jones Players' Player of the Year and Junior Hoops' Player of the Year awards.

Personal life
Willock has two brothers, Matty and Joe, who are also footballers. All three brothers shared a pitch when Manchester United played a reserve game against Arsenal in May 2017. Willock is of Montserratian descent.

Career statistics

Honours
Arsenal Youth
U21 Premier League 2 play-offs: 2016

Individual
UEFA European U-17 Championship Team of the Tournament: 2015
EFL Championship Player of the Month: November 2021
Queens Park Rangers Supporters' Player of the Year: 2021–22
Queens Park Rangers Players' Player of the Year: 2021–22
Junior Hoops' Player of the Year: 2021–22

References

External links

1998 births
Living people
People from the London Borough of Waltham Forest
Black British sportspeople
English footballers
England youth international footballers
English people of Montserratian descent
Association football forwards
Arsenal F.C. players
S.L. Benfica B players
West Bromwich Albion F.C. players
Huddersfield Town A.F.C. players
Liga Portugal 2 players
English expatriate sportspeople in Portugal
English expatriate footballers
Expatriate footballers in Portugal